Mudibakapur  is a village about 2 km from Aurangabad in Bulandshahr district of Uttar Pradesh state in northern India. It has a gram panchayat and comes under Lakhaoti Block. The village has one Govt. Primary School and few private schools. Among the private schools, there is a Sarv Kalyan Junior Higher Secondary School which is a co-ed school.

Shri Shobharam was the first Gram Pradhan of the village. He was a Shiv devotee and cured the people of snake bites. Respected by people, he was also instrumental in construction of small road through the village with the help of people's participation, as in the early 50s there were no funds from government for village. 

Mudibakapur's economy runs on agriculture and people have now also taken up other skills and profession parallelly as the landholdings are decreasing gradually. Hindus and Muslims have been living in harmony for ages. 

People living the villages belong to different castes, viz., Lodhi Rajputs, Gujars, Dheemars, Gararihyas, priests, etc. 

Villages in Bulandshahr district